The following outline is provided as an overview of and topical guide to American Samoa:

American Samoa – unincorporated territory located in the South Pacific Ocean southeast of the Independent State of Samoa.  The main (largest and most populous) island is Tutuila, with the Manua Islands, Rose Atoll, and Swains Island also included in the territory.  American Samoa is part of the Samoan Islands chain, located west of the Cook Islands, north of Tonga, and some 300 miles (500 km) south of Tokelau.

General reference

 Pronunciation:
 Common English country name: American Samoa
 Official English country name: The United States Territory of American Samoa
 Common endonym(s):  
 Official endonym(s):  
 Adjectival(s): American Samoan, Samoan
 Demonym(s):
 ISO country codes: AS, ASM, 016
 ISO region codes: See ISO 3166-2:AS
 Internet country code top-level domain: .as
 Bibliography of American Samoa

Geography of American Samoa

Geography of American Samoa
 The American Samoa is: a Territory of the United States, consisting of a group of islands
 Location:
 Western Hemisphere and Southern Hemisphere
 Pacific Ocean
 South Pacific Ocean
 Oceania
 Polynesia
 Time zone:  Samoa Standard Time (UTC-11)
 Extreme points of American Samoa
 High:  Lata Mountain 
 Low:  South Pacific Ocean 0 m
 Land boundaries:  none
 Coastline:  116 km
 Population of WikiProject Topic outline/Drafts/Topic outline of American Samoa: 68,200 (2007) - 196th most populous country

 Area of WikiProject Topic outline/Drafts/Topic outline of American Samoa:   - 212th largest country
 Atlas of American Samoa

Environment of American Samoa

 Superfund sites in American Samoa
 Wildlife of American Samoa
 Fauna of American Samoa
 Birds of American Samoa
 Mammals of American Samoa

Natural geographic features of American Samoa

  Islands of American Samoa
 Tutuila
 Aunu'u
 Ta'ū
 Ofu‑Olosega
 Rose Atoll
 Swains Island
 Rivers of American Samoa
 Swamps of American Samoa
 World Heritage Sites in American Samoa: None

Regions of American Samoa

Administrative divisions of American Samoa

Administrative divisions of American Samoa
 Districts of American Samoa
 Counties of American Samoa
 Villages of American Samoa

Districts of American Samoa

 Eastern
 Western
 Manu'a

Counties of American Samoa

 By District
 Eastern
Ituau County
Ma'Oputasi County
Sa'Ole County
Sua County
Vaifanua County
 Western
Lealataua County
Leasina County
Tualatai County
Tualauta County
 Manu'a
Faleasao County
Fitiuta County
Ofu County
Olosega County
Ta'u County

Villages of American Samoa

Villages of American Samoa
 Capital of American Samoa: Pago Pago
 Villages of American Samoa

Aasu
Afao
Afono
Agugulu
Alao
Alega
Alofau
Amaluia
Amanave
Amaua
Amouli
Anua
Aoa
Aoloau
Asili
Atu'u
Aua
Auasi
Aumi
Aunu'u
Auto
Avaio
Faga'alu
Faga'itua
Fagali'i
Fagamalo
Faganeanea
Fagasa
Fagatogo
Failolo
Faleasao
Faleniu
Fatumafuti
Futiga
Ili'ili
Lauli'i
Leloaloa
Leone
Leusoali'i
Luma
Maia
Malaeimi
Malaeloa/Aitulagi
Malaeloa/Ituau
Maloata
Mapusagafou
Masausi
Masefau
Matu'u
Mesepa
Nu'uuli
Nua
Ofu
Olosega
Onenoa
Pagai
Pago Pago
Pava'ia'i
Poloa
Rose Atoll
Sa'ilele
Se'etaga
Si'ufaga
Sili
Taulaga
Tafuna
Taputimu
Tula
Utulei
Utumea East
Utumea West
Vailoatai
Vaitogi
Vatia

Demography of American Samoa

Demographics of American Samoa

Government and politics of American Samoa

Politics of American Samoa
 Form of government:  A presidential representative democracy that is a self-governing dependency of the United States
 Capital of American Samoa: Pago Pago official
 Elections in American Samoa
 Political parties in American Samoa

Branches of government

Government of American Samoa

Executive branch of the government of American Samoa
 Head of state: President of the United States
 Head of government: Governor of American Samoa
 Cabinet of American Samoa

Legislative branch of the government of American Samoa
 American Samoa Fono (bicameral and nonpartisan)
 Upper house: American Samoa Senate
 Lower house: American Samoa House of Representatives

Judicial branch of the government of American Samoa

Judiciary of American Samoa
 High Court of American Samoa

International organization membership
The United States Territory of American Samoa is a member of:
International Criminal Police Organization (Interpol) (subbureau)
International Olympic Committee (IOC)
Secretariat of the Pacific Community (SPC)
Universal Postal Union (UPU)

Law and order in American Samoa

 Cannabis in American Samoa
 Constitution of American Samoa
 Human rights in American Samoa
 LGBT rights in American Samoa
 Freedom of religion in American Samoa
 Law enforcement in American Samoa

Military of American Samoa

Military of American Samoa

History of American Samoa

History of American Samoa

History of American Samoa, by period 
Polynesians settle Samoan archipelago about 1000 BCE
Samoans
Fa'asamoa
Fa'amatai
Fono
European and American contact, 1722–1899
Jacob Roggeveen, 1722
Louis-Antoine de Bougainville, 1768
Jean-François de Galaup, comte de La Pérouse, 1787
John Williams, 1830–1839
United States Territory of American Samoa, since December 2, 1899
Anglo-German Samoa Convention, November 14, 1899
Division of the Samoan archipelago, December 2, 1899
Constitution of American Samoa of July 1, 1967
National Park of American Samoa established on October 31, 1988

Culture of American Samoa

Culture of American Samoa
 Languages of American Samoa
 National symbols of American Samoa
 Coat of arms of American Samoa
 Flag of American Samoa
 National anthem of American Samoa
 People of American Samoa
 Religion in American Samoa
 Islam in American Samoa
 World Heritage Sites in American Samoa: None

Art in American Samoa
 Music of American Samoa

Sports in American Samoa

Sports in American Samoa
 Football in American Samoa
 American Samoa at the Olympics

Economy and infrastructure of American Samoa

Economy of American Samoa
 Economic rank, by nominal GDP (2007): 182nd (one hundred and eight second)
 Communications in American Samoa
 Internet in American Samoa
Currency of American Samoa: Dollar
ISO 4217: USD
 Transportation in American Samoa
 Airports in American Samoa

See also

Topic overview:
American Samoa

Index of American Samoa-related articles
Bibliography of American Samoa

References

External links

 Government of American Samoa
 
 
 Gay marriage debate in American Samoa

 Country Data
 American Samoa. The World Factbook. Central Intelligence Agency.

 
 
American Samoa
American Samoa